In Greek mythology, the name Polypheides or Polyphides (Ancient Greek: Πολυφείδης) may refer to:

Polypheides, son of Mantius and brother of Cleitus. He was granted prophetic skills by Apollo and became the best seer among mortals after the death of Amphiaraus; he dwelt in Hyperesia and had a son Theoclymenus. A slightly different account of his life was given by Pherecydes: according to it, Polypheides married Aechme, daughter of Haemon, and settled in Eleusis, where two sons, Theoclymenus and Harmonides, were born to him.
Polypheides, lord of Sicyon, to whom Agamemnon and Menelaus were entrusted by their nurse or sent by Aegisthus after the murder of Atreus. He further sent them to Oeneus.

Notes

References 

 Apollodorus, The Library with an English Translation by Sir James George Frazer, F.B.A., F.R.S. in 2 Volumes, Cambridge, MA, Harvard University Press; London, William Heinemann Ltd. 1921. ISBN 0-674-99135-4. Online version at the Perseus Digital Library. Greek text available from the same website.
 Homer, The Odyssey with an English Translation by A.T. Murray, PH.D. in two volumes. Cambridge, MA., Harvard University Press; London, William Heinemann, Ltd. 1919. . Online version at the Perseus Digital Library. Greek text available from the same website.
 Tzetzes, John, Book of Histories, Book I translated by Ana Untila from the original Greek of T. Kiessling's edition of 1826. Online version at theio.com

Mythological Greek seers
Mythological kings of Sicyon
Kings in Greek mythology
Argive characters in Greek mythology
Sicyonian characters in Greek mythology
Eleusinian mythology
Mythology of Achaea